Crenicichla lucenai is a species of cichlid native to South America. It is found swimming in the Upper Rio das Antas basin, Jacuí river drainage, dos Patos lagoon system in Brazil.

The fish is named in honor of Carlos Alberto Santos de Lucena, the curator of fishes at the Museu de Ciências e Tecnologia de Pontificia Universidade Católica do Rio Grande do Sul, for his contributions to the taxonomy and systematics of the Crenicichla genus.

References

lucenai
Freshwater fish of Brazil
Taxa named by José Leonardo de Oliveira Mattos, 
Taxa named by Ingo Schindler 
Taxa named by Felipe Polivanov Ottoni & 

Taxa named by Morevy Moreira Cheffe
Fish described in 2014